Radical 171 or radical slave meaning "slave" is one of the 9 Kangxi radicals (214 radicals in total) composed of 8 strokes.

In the Kangxi Dictionary, there are 12 characters (out of 49,030) to be found under this radical.

 is also the 178th indexing component in the Table of Indexing Chinese Character Components predominantly adopted by Simplified Chinese dictionaries published in mainland China.

Evolution

Derived characters

Literature

External links

Unihan Database - U+96B6

171
178